Splendori e miserie di Madame Royale (also known as Madame Royale) is a 1970 Italian comedy drama film directed by Vittorio Caprioli.

Cast 
 Ugo Tognazzi: Alessio/Madame Royale
 Vittorio Caprioli: Bambola di Pekino
 Jenny Tamburi: Mimmina
 Maurice Ronet: commissioner
 Maurizio Bonuglia: Pino Rinotti
 Simonetta Stefanelli: the prisoner

References

External links

1970 films
Commedia all'italiana
Films directed by Vittorio Caprioli
1970 comedy-drama films
Italian LGBT-related films
LGBT-related comedy-drama films
1970 LGBT-related films
Films scored by Fiorenzo Carpi
1970s Italian-language films
1970s Italian films